Hans Langerijs (born 14 January 1953) is a Dutch former racing cyclist. He rode in the 1980 Tour de France.

Major results

1975
 1st Overall Olympia's Tour
1977
 1st Overall Niedersachsen Rundfahrt
1978
 9th Overall Setmana Catalana de Ciclisme
1979
 5th Overall Circuit Cycliste Sarthe
1st Stage 4b
1980
 5th Overall Driedaagse van De Panne-Koksijde
1982
 6th La Flèche Wallonne
 9th Dwars door België
1983
 5th Dwars door België
1984
 7th Kuurne–Brussels–Kuurne
 9th Brabantse Pijl

References

External links
 

1953 births
Living people
Dutch male cyclists
People from Drechterland
Cyclists from North Holland